Géza Szőcs (21 August 1953 – 5 November 2020) was an ethnic Hungarian poet and politician from Transylvania, Romania, who served as Secretary of State for Culture of the Ministry of National Resources in Hungary from 2 June 2010 to 13 June 2012.

Life
Szőcs was born in Târgu Mureș, Romania. His mother is literary translator  (b. 1928). He studied until 1979 at the Babeș-Bolyai University of Cluj. On a proposal by András Sütő, he received a scholarship for the 1979-80 semester at the University of Vienna. Szőcs edited the Hungarian-language samizdat Ellenpontok, because of this he was interrogated and abused by Securitate, secret police agency of the Ceaușescu regime.

From 1986 to 1989, after working in the scientific literature seminar of the Babeș-Bolyai University, Géza Szőcs went into political exile in Switzerland, where he worked in Geneva as a journalist. Between 1989 and 1990, he conducted the Budapest studio of Radio Free Europe. In 1989, he joined the staff of the magazine Magyar Napló of the Hungarian Writers' Association.

In 1990, Szőcs returned to Cluj and was active in the Democratic Union of Hungarians in Romania (RMDSZ), for which he sat from 1990 to 1992 in the Romanian Senate. From 1993 to 2010, he was editor of the magazine A Dunánál in Hungary. He was co-editor of the magazine Magyar Szemle and a member of the supervision of the Hungarian state television Magyar Televízió (MTV). Szőcs was a founding member of the Hungarian Civic Cooperation Association since 1996.

In May 2010, he was appointed Hungary's Secretary of State for Culture by Prime Minister Viktor Orbán. In 2011, he was elected president of the Hungarian Pen Club. He resigned from his position in June 2012. He was replaced by László L. Simon. Szőcs became chief cultural adviser to Prime Minister Orbán. In 2013, He was appointed government commissioner for the Hungarian pavilion in Expo 2015. This activity was accompanied by a number of criticisms and scandals. The Hungarian pavilion, the "Shaman drum" cost HUF 2 billion of public funds. The design of the eclectic building received serious criticism. Szőcs was appointed Prime Ministerial Commissioner for Culture in 2018.

Personal life
Géza Szőcs had five children.

Szőcs was infected with COVID-19 in October 2020, during the COVID-19 pandemic in Hungary. He was admitted to a hospital in Budapest, where he was reportedly in serious condition in intensive care. According to Index.hu, Szőcs was on ventilation for weeks. He died on 5 November 2020, of complications from COVID-19.

Works
 Te mentél át a vízen? Bucharest, Kriterion, 1975.
 Kilátótorony és környéke Bucharest, Kriterion, 1977.
 Párbaj, avagy a huszonharmadik hóhullás  Cluj-Napoca, 1979.
 A szélnek eresztett bábu Budapest, Magvető Könyvkiadó, 1986.
 Az uniformis látogatása New York City, Hungarian Human Rights Foundation, 1987.
 Kitömött utcák, hegedűk Köln-Budapest, Literarische Briefe/Irodalmi levelek, 1988.
 A sirálybőr cipő Budapest, Magvető, 1989.
 Históriák a küszöb alól Budapest, Szépirodalmi Kiadó, 1990.
 A vendégszerető avagy Szindbád Marienbadban  Budapest, Szépirodalmi Könyvkiadó, 1992.
 A kisbereki böszörmények Cluj-Napoca, Erdélyi Híradó, 1995.
 Ki cserélte el a népet? Cluj-Napoca, Erdélyi Híradó, 1996.
 Passió Budapest, Magvető Könyvkiadó, 1999.
 Drámák, hangjátékok Budapest, Kortárs kiadó, 2002.
 A magyar ember és a zombi Budapest, Kortárs Kiadó 2003. 
 Liberté 1956 Budapest, A Dunánál 2006. 
 Limpopo Budapest, Magvető 2007. 
 Beszéd a palackból Arad, Irodalmi Jelen Könyvek, 2008.
 Amikor fordul az ezred (Beszélgetőkönyv és dokumentumgyűjtemény; Sz. G. és Farkas Wellmann Endre) Budapest, Ulpius-ház, 2009.
 Nyestbeszéd (Szőcs Géza 33 verse Faludy György válogatásában) Budapest, Ulpius-ház, 2010.
 Tasso Marchini és Dsida Jenő Budapest, Szent István Társulat, 2010.
 La missione di Rasputin-Raszputyin küldetése Novara, Arcipelago Edizioni,

Awards
 1976 - Writers' Union of Romania Debut Award
 1986 - Robert Graves Prize
 1986 - Milán Füst Prize
 1990 - Book of the Year
 1992 - Tibor Déry Prize
 1993 - Gabriel Bethlen Prize
 1993 - Attila József Prize
 2006 - Award for Hungarian Art
 2008 - Writers' Union of Romania's Award for Limpopo
 2009 - Prize of the European Academy of Vienna

References

Sources
 MTI ki kicsoda 2009. Szerk. Hermann Péter. Budapest: Magyar Távirati Iroda. 2008. 
 Éva Blénesi: Szőcs Géza. Kalligram Kiadó, 2000 
 William Totok: Minderheiten und Securitate. Halbjahresschrift für südosteuropäische Geschichte, Literatur und Politik, 23. Jg., 1–2, 2011, p. 77-110.

Further information
 Irodalmi Jelen
 Versek 
 Haiku 
 2 vers 1956-ról
 Liberté ’56 c. művéből készült filmváltozat forgatása
 Kortárs magyar írók
 Levélváltás Szőcs Géza államtitkárral a Magyar Nemzeti Múzeumban lecsiszolt hun fibuláról
 Szőcs Géza művei műfordításokban – Bábel Web Antológia
 Konfliktusok során át küzdötte magát az államtitkárságig Szőcs Géza – Origo, 2010. augusztus 16.

External links 
 
 

1953 births
2020 deaths
Hungarian politicians
Hungarian journalists
20th-century Hungarian poets
20th-century Hungarian male writers
Romanian poets
Romanian male poets
Members of the Senate of Romania
Babeș-Bolyai University alumni
Democratic Union of Hungarians in Romania politicians
People from Târgu Mureș
Attila József Prize recipients
21st-century Hungarian poets
21st-century Hungarian male writers
Hungarian male poets
Deaths from the COVID-19 pandemic in Hungary
Hungarian editors
Radio Free Europe/Radio Liberty people